Atchison, Topeka & Santa Fe No. 5 Little Buttercup (former ATSF #2419, Santa Fe Terminal #1) is an 0-4-0 steam locomotive.

History 
"Little Buttercup" was originally built in 1899 by the Baldwin Locomotive Works as an 0-4-0 saddle tank locomotive for the Santa Fe Terminal Railway as their #1. The SFT was a subsidiary of the Atchison, Topeka & Santa Fe Railway, operating under the moniker of the San Francisco & San Joaquin Valley Railway, was designed to run a terminal operation in the China Basin around San Francisco, California. It was absorbed into the ATSF system in 1902, and SFT #1 became ATSF #2419. She was then moved to the shops at Needles, California to work there as the "shop goat," and was renumbered at least 3 more times till finally running with the road number #9419 in 1948.

That same year was the Chicago Railroad Fair, and Santa Fe had chosen #9419 to be their exhibition engine. She was rebuilt into a tender engine with an 1800s "Old West" style appearance with a diamond smokestack, gaining the #5 and the name "Little Buttercup," after a 4-4-0 locomotive that had previously carried the name. That one had been scrapped in 1899. After 1948, the Santa Fe had kept "Little Buttercup" in storage, along with some ancient wooden coaches, for exhibitions and special events. She was the star a few commercials for the ATSF, even starring with Randolph Scott in the 1951 film Santa Fe where she was driven by a Native American chief.

"Little Buttercup" was eventually donated with the rest of the ATSF's historical collection to the California State Railroad Museum in 1986, where she attended their famed "Railfair" event the same year. The locomotive is now on long-term loan to the California Trolley and Railroad Corporation, and is currently on display in their Trolley Barn at the History Park at Kelley Park.

References

5
Baldwin locomotives
Individual locomotives of the United States
0-4-0 locomotives
Standard gauge locomotives of the United States
Railway locomotives introduced in 1899
Preserved steam locomotives of California